Edward Roughley (26 September 1879 – 1948) was an English footballer who played in the Football League for Hull City.

References

1879 births
1948 deaths
English footballers
Association football goalkeepers
English Football League players
Skelmersdale United F.C. players
Hull City A.F.C. players
Chesterfield F.C. players